Tamil Selvi is a 2019 Tamil-language family soap opera replacing Chandrakumari serial and its starring Chaithra Sakkari and Vijay. It premiered on  Sun TV on 3 June 2019 to 31 March 2020 and is produced by Sun Entertainment and Vision Time India Pvt Ltd and directed by Dhanush  The soap opera was prematurely ended by the Sun TV Network due to COVID-19 pandemic.

Story
A Tamil girl named Tamil Selvi is interested in studying and moving from her village to the city. But the two families want her to marry her cousin Saravanan. She marries Amudhan due to unavoidable circumstances. This is the story of how she succeeds in her studies, overcoming the new relationships that refuse to accept her in a house that has broken into both families.

Cast

Main
 Ashika Gopak Padukone (1-100) and Sandra Babu (101-192) and Chaithra Sakkari (193-247) as TamilSelvi Amudhan (Amudhan's wife) 
 Ashwin Kumar(1-46) and Vijay(47-247) as Amudhan (Tamil Selvi's husband)

Supporting
 Nishma Chengappa as Rudra Saravanan (Selvarani's younger sister, Saravanan's wife)
 Varshika Nayak and Niharikka as Ilakkiya (Tamil Selvi's college friend, Amudhan's sister)
 Preethi Kumar as Dilruba (Rajarajan's arch-rival)
 Arunkumar Padmanabhan as Saravanan (Tamilselvi's cousin, Rudra's husband) 
 Jay Srinivas Kumar as Shiva (Dilruba's brother and Ilakkiya's husband)
 M. J. Shriram and Raja Senthil as Rajarajan (Ilakkiya and Amudhan's father)
 Sabitha Anand as Shenbagavalli Rajarajan (Ilakkiya and Amudhan's mother)
 Manush as Aatralarasu (Ilakkiya and Amudhan's brother)
 "Metti Oli" Vanaja as Selvarani (Aatralarasu's wife, Ilakkiya and Amudhan's sister-in-law)
 Suhasini as Mangayarkarasi (Ilakkiya and Amudhan's aunt)
 A. Sakunthala as Annabharathi (Ilakkiya and Amudhan's grandmother)
 Priya as Rajeshwari (Rajarajan's sister, Dilruba and Shiva's mother) 
 Parthan Siva as Velmurugan 
 Neha Menon as Mallika (Tamil Selvi's sister)
 Usha Sai as Namitha (Tamil Selvi's college friend)
 VJ Nisha as Neelaveni (Saravanan's sister)
 Vasu Vikram as Shakthivel (Tamil Selvi's uncle)
 Deepa Iyer as Valarmathi (Tamil Selvi's aunt)
 Suresh as Senthil (Shaktivel's son)
 Jeganathan as Thangavel (Tamil Selvi's father)
 Dhakshayini as Venmathi (Tamil Selvi's mother, Shaktivel's sister)
 Kumaresan and Vishwanathan as Vetrivel (Tamil Selvi's uncle, Shaktivel's brother)
 "Meesai" Rajendranath as Palaniswamy (Saravanan's father)
 Raghavi as Palaniammal (Saravanan's mother)
 Kovai Kamala as Tamil Selvi's grandmother
 Dr. Sharmila as Dr Indira (Shenbagavalli's friend)
 Gowthami Vembunathan as Ezhilarasi (Doctor Kamaraj's wife and Amudhan's aunt)
 G. Gnanasambandam as Dr Kamaraj (Amudhan's uncle and Ezhilarasi's husband)
 Avinash Ashok as Muthu (Amudhan's friend)

Guests
Meena as Herself (promo) 
Kavya Shastry as Kavya (lawyer)

Production
Tamil Film actress Meena featured in an initial promo of the series  before its premiere.

Initially Ashika Gopak Padukone played the lead Tamil Selvi. Soon, she quit and was replaced by Sandra Babu who was again replaced by Chaithira Sakkari.

Adaptations

Crossover episodes
 From 6 January 2020 – 10 January 2020, Nila had a crossover with Tamil Selvi between 5 episodes (184-188).

References

External links
 

Sun TV original programming
2019 Tamil-language television series debuts
Tamil-language television shows
2020 Tamil-language television series endings
Tamil-language melodrama television series
Television series impacted by the COVID-19 pandemic